Korea National Sport University (KNSU) is a South Korean national university located in the neighborhood of Bangi-dong, Songpa-gu, Seoul. It is the only national sport university of South Korea and offers degrees from undergraduate to doctoral level. Its broad range of course offerings caters to amateur athletes, professional athletes representing the national team and accredited physical education teachers.

History
The success of wrestler Yang Jung-mo at the 1976 Summer Olympics prompted the South Korean government to consider opening a government-funded sports school. At that time, sports was still semi-professional and had little oversight by any centralized governing body while student athletics were primarily dominated by Korea University and Yonsei University, both of which are private universities. In December 1977, the South Korean government announced plans to open the Korean National College of Physical Education under the Presidential Decree (No. 8322). Rather than begin as a 2-year junior college and gradually expand, as was the case with many universities, the college was founded as a 4-year degree-granting institution.

Its first students were admitted the following March for the 1978–79 academic year. The campus was then located in Nowon-gu on the outskirts of Seoul and only offered a major in physical education. The 1980s to 1990s saw rapid expansion in its course offerings as coaching, community sports, sports and leisure studies, health management, sports safety management, taekwondo and sports media were added. Graduate programs and evening classes for working students were added. The lack of space in Nowon-gu and construction of facilities for the 1988 Summer Olympics in Songpa-gu led to the decision to relocate the college to its present-day campus. It gained university status in 1993. The evening classes for working students were phased out by the 2000s in favor of other options, such as online learning, short certificate courses and part-time studies.

Academics
The university is organized into two colleges and a division. Its graduate school is organized into three interdisciplinary schools which only oversee master's and doctorate degree programs.
College of Sports Science
Department of Physical Education
College of Lifetime Sport
Department of Community Sport
Department of Youth Guidance and Sports Education
Department of Dance
Department of Adapted Physical Education
Department of Taekwondo
Department of Sports and Leisure Studies
Department of Health and Exercise Science
Department of Sport and Healthy Aging
Division of Liberal Arts and Science

Research
Since 2019, KNSU has been a partner institution of Yonsei Institute of Sports Science & Exercise Medicine (YISSEM). The research institute specializes in sports medicine, pooling its resources from the well-established physical education programs of both universities and Yonsei's College of Medicine and Severance Hospital system. YISSEM was chosen by the International Olympic Committee as a partner research center specializing in athlete health and injury prevention.

Admissions
As a designated national university, tuition fees are low for domestic students. Due to the stipulations of its founding decree, undergraduate students majoring in physical education and sports guidance have different criteria from other national universities and receive a full tuition waiver and fully-subsidized room and board, with the requirement that they reside in the dormitories throughout the duration of their studies.

Notable alumni
Viktor An (Ahn Hyun-soo), short-track speed skater and coach, former world record holder in the 3000m event and multiple-times medalist at the Olympics and World Championships
Go Woo-ri, singer (Rainbow)
Im Sung-jae, professional golfer, 2018-19 PGA Tour Rookie of the Year
Kim Jung-hwan, sabre fencer and three-time Olympic medalist
Soo Yeon Lee, table tennis player, coach, and model
Lim Hyo-jun, short-track gold medalist at the 2018 Pyeongchang Olympics
Park Sang-young, épée gold medalist at the 2016 Rio de Janeiro Olympics
Shim Suk-hee, short-track gold medalist at the 2018 Pyeongchang Olympics
Won Jeong-sik, weightlifting gold medalist at the 2017 World Weightlifting Championships
Won Woo-young, sabre fencer and Olympic gold medalist
Yang Hak-seon, former gymnast and gold medalist in the vault at the Olympics and World Championships
Yun Sung-bin, skeleton gold medalist at the 2018 Pyeongchang Olympics

See also
 Beijing Sport University
 Korea Armed Forces Athletic Corps
 Korea National Training Center
 Korea Sports Council
 List of national universities in South Korea
 List of universities and colleges in South Korea
 Education in Korea

References

External links
Official website (in Korean)
Official website (in English)

 
Universities and colleges in Seoul
Songpa District
Sports universities and colleges
1972 establishments in South Korea
Educational institutions established in 1972